Rockledge is a historic summer estate house on Vermont Route 207 in Swanton, Vermont.  Architect Charles Saxe in 1918 designed alterations to an early 19th-century farmhouse, that is the principal surviving element of an early 20th-century gentleman's farm.  The property was listed on the National Register of Historic Places in 1994.

Description and history
Rockledge is located in southern Swanton, on the west side of VT 207 south of its junction with Decker Road. A stone wall lines the front of the property, with a row of maple trees between that wall and the house. A semicircular drive provides access at two points from the road to the rear of the house. The house is a -story wood-frame structure, with a side-gable roof and flanking two-story wings. The main block facade is five bays wide, with a center entrance sheltered by a Colonial Revival portico supported by clustered Tuscan columns. The gable ends on the sides have Federal style fans at their center.

The construction date of the house is not known.  It exhibits architectural features suggesting it was built about 1803, but shows signs of modifications c. 1819, using technology not available at the earlier time.  Much of its appearance, both inside and out, is the result of a major renovation by Clark Jennison between 1918 and 1920, to a design by Montreal architect Charles Saxe.  The house was greatly enlarged, and its interior spaces were given a formal Colonial Revival finish.  The landscaping of the property also dates to this period, and originally included a larger number of barns and outbuildings, which succumbed to fire in 1980.  The property is one of Vermont's finer examples of an adaptive reuse of an early 19th-century farm property as a summer estate, in this case by members of the same family.

See also
National Register of Historic Places listings in Franklin County, Vermont

References

Houses on the National Register of Historic Places in Vermont
National Register of Historic Places in Franklin County, Vermont
Colonial Revival architecture in Vermont
Houses completed in 1918
Houses in Franklin County, Vermont
Buildings and structures in Swanton, Vermont